Nuccio Cusumano (born Stefano Cusumano; October 16, 1948) is an Italian politician whose most recent political appointment was to the Italian Senate (April 26, 2006 – April 28, 2008) on the roster of the UDEUR party as one of thirty representatives for the Campania constituency.

Born in Sciacca (Sicily), he holds a law degree and has worked as an entrepreneur and as a journalist.

In the course of his political career, he has held several government positions, including that of Undersecretary of State for the Treasury (then headed by Carlo Azeglio Ciampi) during the premiership of Massimo D'Alema, between 1998 and 1999.

In 1994, as a member of the Italian People's Party (PPI), he helped then-Prime Minister Silvio Berlusconi survive a vote of confidence. He was one of four PPI senators who, against the instructions of their party, physically left the Senate room, rendering the house without a quorum.

In 1999, while a junior Treasury Minister, he was arrested under allegations of corruption in relation to construction contracts for a hospital in Sicily. In 2007, the court in Catania exonerated him completely.

On 24 January 2008, in the 2008 Italian political crisis, Cusumano supported Prime Minister Romano Prodi in a confidence vote, again against the instructions of his party, UDEUR. Another UDEUR senator, Tommaso Barbato, launched into a vicious verbal attack and had to be restrained from physically attacking Cusumano, who appeared to faint and was carried out of the house.

Expelled from UDEUR because of his decision, he joined the Democratic Party. As a candidate in the April 2008 elections, he was not re-elected.

References

External links
Personal page on Italian Senate website 

1948 births
Living people
People from Sciacca
Presidents of the Province of Agrigento
Christian Democracy (Italy) politicians
20th-century Italian politicians
Italian People's Party (1994) politicians
Union of Democrats for Europe politicians
Democratic Party (Italy) politicians
21st-century Italian politicians
Senators of Legislature XI of Italy
Senators of Legislature XII of Italy
Deputies of Legislature XIV of Italy
Senators of Legislature XV of Italy
Italian journalists
Italian male journalists